Shahroud Space Center (Persian:) is a Military Spaceport under control of the Islamic Revolutionary Guard Corps Aeorospace Force (IRGCASF) located south-east of Shahroud Semnan Province, used to orbit military satellites for Iran's military space program.

Overview 

The launch of the Noor 1 satellite on April 22nd 2020 using the Qased launch vehicle out of Shahroud space center revealed the existence of a parallel military space program run by the IRGC as opposed to Iran's civil space program run by the Iranian Space Agency (ISA).

The site features a 23 meter tall servicing tower, a concrete launch pad 200 by 140 meters and an exhaust deflector with a length of 125 meters; Interestingly, the site features no storage facilities and fuel tanks for liquid rocket fuel, and is primarily designed to launch solid fueled launch vehicles such as the Qased and the under development Qaem.

Launch history

See also 

 Qased (rocket)
 IRGCASF
 Semnan Space Center

References 

Spaceports
Space program of Iran
Buildings and structures in Semnan Province